The 2003 Tata Open was a men's tennis tournament played on outdoor hard courts at the SDAT Tennis Stadium in Chennai, India and was part of the International Series of the 2003 ATP Tour. The tournament ran from 30 December 2002 through 5 January 2003. Second-seeded Paradorn Srichaphan won the singles title.

Finals

Singles

 Paradorn Srichaphan defeated  Karol Kučera 6–3, 6–1
 It was Srichaphan's 1st title of the year and the 3rd of his career.

Doubles

 Julian Knowle /  Michael Kohlmann defeated  František Čermák /  Leoš Friedl 7–6(7–1), 7–6(7–3)
 It was Knowle's 1st title of the year and the 3rd of his career. It was Kohlmann's only title of the year and the 2nd of his career.

References

External links
 Official website
 ATP tournament profile

 
Tata Open
Tata Open
Chennai Open